The suborder Ascaridina contains the bulk of the Ascaridida, parasitic roundworms with three "lips" on the anterior end. The Ascaridida were formerly placed in the subclass Rhabditia by some, but morphological and DNA sequence data rather unequivocally assigns them to the Spiruria. The Oxyurida and Rhigonematida are occasionally placed in the Ascaridina as superfamily Oxyuroidea, but while they seem indeed to be Spiruria, they are not as close to Ascaris as such a treatment would place them.

These "worms" contain a number of important parasites of humans and domestic animals, namely in the superfamily Ascaridoidea.

Systematics
The Ascaridina contain the following superfamilies and families:
Superfamily Ascaridoidea
 Acanthocheilidae
 Anisakidae
 Ascarididae
 Crossophoridae
 Goeziidae
 Raphidascarididae (disputed)
 Toxocaridae
Superfamily Cosmocercoidea
 Atractidae
 Cosmocercidae
 Kathlaniidae
Superfamily Heterakoidea
 Ascaridiidae
 Aspidoderidae (disputed)
 Heterakidae

Superfamily Seuratoidea
 Chitwoodchabaudiidae (disputed)
 Cucullanidae
 Quimperiidae
 Schneidernematidae
 Seuratidae
Superfamily Subuluroidea
 Maupasinidae
 Subuluridae

Footnotes

References 
  (2008): Suborder Ascaridina. Version of 2008-AUG-14. Retrieved 2008-NOV-05.
  (2002): Nematoda. Version of 2002-JAN-01. Retrieved 2008-NOV-02.

Ascaridida
Protostome suborders